Voltage-dependent L-type calcium channel subunit beta-1 is a protein that in humans is encoded by the CACNB1 gene.

The protein encoded by this gene belongs to the calcium channel beta subunit family. It plays an important role in the calcium channel by modulating G protein inhibition, increasing peak calcium current, controlling the alpha-1 subunit membrane targeting and shifting the voltage dependence of activation and inactivation. Alternative splicing occurs at this locus and three transcript variants encoding three distinct isoforms have been identified.

See also
 Voltage-dependent calcium channel

References

Further reading

External links 
 
 

Ion channels